Tilsit Éditions was a French game publisher started in 1996 by Didier Jacobée. It made board games, strategy games, games for kids, and other such games until 2010.

Tilsit also distributed a number of French versions of Kosmos games, but the collaboration ended in 2006. Since 2003, Tilsit has published three main lines: Tilsit Collection for large-box games, Tilsit Poche for small-box multiplayer games and Tilsit Famille for intermediate games.

Some games published in French by Tilsit
Stratego, 1947, Jacques Johan Mogendorff
Les Colons de Catane, 1995, Klaus Teuber, Spiel des Jahres 1995, Deutscher Spiele Preis 1995
Kahuna, 1998, Super As d'Or 2000
Puerto Rico, 2002, Andreas Seyfarth, Deutscher Spiele Preis 2002
Les Évadés de Cartagena, 2005, Leo Colovini (in 2000 with Winning Moves)

Tilsit Collection

Maka Bana, 2003, Prix du Public du Jeu de Saint-Herblain 2004, Trophée Flip 2004
Kanaloa, 2003, 
Skåål, 2004, Thierry Lebourg alias Dr. Mops
Himalaya, 2004, Régis Bonnessée
Key Largo, 2005, Paul Randles, Mike Selinker and Bruno Faidutti

Tilsit Poche

Wanted!, 2003, Emiliano Sciarra
Korsar, 2005, Reiner Knizia
Fantasy Pub, 2005, Emanuele Ornella
Caramba!, 2005, Michael Schacht
Red Hot Silly Dragon, 2005, Guillaume Blossier et Frédéric Henry

Board game publishing companies

External Links
 https://escaleajeux.fr/?jeu=1&edi=tilsit
 https://www.boardgamegeek.com/boardgame/Tilsit
 http://luding.org/Skripte/PublisherData.py/ENpublisherid/1348

References